Maria Sole Agnelli (born 9 August 1925) is an Italian entrepreneur, politician, and a major shareholder of Gianni Agnelli & Co.

Early life 
She is the fourth daughter of Edoardo Agnelli (1892–1935) and Virginia Bourbon del Monte (1899–1945). Her siblings are Clara Agnelli (1920–2016), Susanna Agnelli (1922–2009), Gianni Agnelli (1921–2003), Giorgio Agnelli (1929–1965), Cristiana Agnelli (born 1927), and Umberto Agnelli (1934–2004). She is the granddaughter of Giovanni Agnelli (1866–1945), founder of the Italian automobile maker Fiat S.p.A.

Later life 
Agnelli married Ranieri Campello della Spina, Count of Campello sul Clitunno (1908–1959), with whom she had four children: Virginia (1954), Argenta (1955), Cintia (1956), and Bernardino (1958). Widowed after Ranieri's death in 1959, she later married Count Pio Teodorani-Fabbri (1924–2022) in 1964, with whom she had her son Eduardo (1965). Teodorani-Fabbri was related to Benito Mussolini, as Mussolini's niece had married Teodorani-Fabbri's cousin.

Political career 
Agnelli was elected mayor of Campello sul Clitunno in 1960, a position she held until 1970. She reportedly won without attending any campaign rallies, obtaining 850 votes from 1,200 voters. Her dead husband's son, Rovero, followed in her footsteps, becoming mayor of Campello sul Clitunno.

Other activities 
Agnelli's horse Woodland, ridden by Alessandro Argenton, won the silver medal in the Equestrian at the 1972 Summer Olympics – Individual eventing in Munich. She is the second largest stock holder of Gianni Agnelli & Co., which owns the majority of Exor and Fiat Chrysler Automobiles; she owns about 12% of the company's shares. She was the president of the Gianni Agnelli Foundation, which she resigned so that the role could be assumed by John Elkann, Agnelli's grandnephew.

References

Further reading

External links 
 XXVII concorso ippico a Piazza di Siena, presenti il Conte Campello, Lillio Sforza Ruspoli, Alessandra Torlonia, Principessa Colonna, Carla Gronchi, Ghea Pallavicini, la contessa Pignatelli e Anna Guardarini at the Senate's Luce Archive (in Italian)
 Descendants of Giovanni Agnelli and Clara Boselli at Hein Bruins (in English)
 FEI Eventing Nations Cup: Maria Sole Agnelli Presidente onorario at Evening Italy (in Italian)

1925 births
Maria
Italian countesses
Living people
Politicians of Umbria